The 2014 ICC Europe Division Two was an international 20-over cricket tournament hosted in Essex, England, from 23 to 26 June 2014. The first round of matches were held at the County Cricket Ground, Chelmsford, while all other games were split between Garon Park, Southend-on-Sea, and the Toby Howe Cricket Ground, Billericay.

The tournament was contested by six teams, Austria, Belgium, Germany, Gibraltar, the Isle of Man, and Norway. The teams played each other once in a round-robin, with Norway finishing undefeated from their five matches to gain promotion to the 2015 ICC Europe Division One tournament. Belgium were the runner-up, while Germany were winless. Two Norwegian players, Ehtsham Ul-Haq and Safir Hayat, led the tournament in runs and wickets, respectively.

Squads

Points table 

Source: CricketArchive

Matches

Statistics

Most runs
The top five run scorers (total runs) are included in this table.

Source: CricketArchive

Most wickets

The top five wicket takers are listed in this table, listed by wickets taken and then by bowling average.

Source: CricketArchive

External links
 CricketArchive

International cricket competitions in 2014
International cricket competitions in England
2014 in English cricket